The 2018 European Road Cycling Championships was the 24th running of the European Road Cycling Championships, and took place from 12 to 15 July 2018 in Brno, Czech Republic for the under-23 and junior events, and from 5 to 9 August 2018 in Glasgow, United Kingdom for the elite events. The event consisted of a total of 6 road races and 6 time trials, regulated by the Union Européenne de Cyclisme (UEC).

The elite portion of the Championships in Glasgow formed a section of both a first unified UEC European Cycling Championships, and the first multi-sport European Championships.

Elite

Medal table

Under 23

Junior

Overall medal table

References

External links
 Official Glasgow website
 Brno technical guide

European Road Championships by year
European Road Championships, 2018
European Road
European Road
Road
International cycle races hosted by England
International cycle races hosted by the Czech Republic
Sport in Brno
International sports competitions in Glasgow
European Road Championships
European Road Championships
Road
Cycling in Scotland